Van Eyck or Van Eijk is a Dutch toponymic surname. Eijck, Eyck, Eyk and Eijk are all archaic spellings of modern Dutch  ("oak") and the surname literally translates as "from/of oak". However, in most cases, the family name refers to an origin in Maaseik. This city on the Meuse, now  in Belgium on the border with the Netherlands, was originally simply known as Eike (with many spellings) and from the 13th century as Old Eyck and New Eyck. Names with a particle, like Van der Eijk are more likely to refer directly to the tree. People with this surname include:

Renaissance family of painters

The important Flemish family of Early Netherlandish painters with the surname van Eyck originated in Maaseik, but ultimately established their professional domicile in Ghent and in Bruges. There they changed the traditional habits of the earlier schools, remodeled the earlier forms of Flemish design, and introduced a substantial revolution into the technical methods of execution familiar to their countrymen. These painters were responsible for many famous works of the 15th century.

Family members included: Hubert van Eyck (1380s – 1426), Jan van Eyck (c.1390 – 1441), their brother Lambert van Eyck, and sister Margareta van Eyck, Jan's wife, also Margaretha (1405/06 – aft.1441), and probably Barthélemy d'Eyck (c.1420 – aft.1470) from the next generation. Jan van Eyck, active in Bruges, is probably the best known Northern European painter of the 15th century.

Other people

Van Eyck
Aldo van Eyck (1918–1999), Dutch architect, son of Pieter Nicolaas
Casper van Eyck (1613–1674), Flemish marine painter
Jacob van Eyck (c. 1590 – 1657), Dutch musician and carillon technician
Jannie van Eyck-Vos (born 1936), Dutch track and field athlete
Marie-Paule Van Eyck (born 1951), Belgian fencer
Nangila van Eyck (born 1984), Dutch football striker
Nicolaas van Eyck (1617–1679), Flemish painter of landscapes, equestrian and battle scenes, civil processions and portraits
Peter van Eyck (1911–1969), German-American actor
Pieter Nicolaas van Eyck (1887–1954), Dutch poet and philosopher, father of Aldo and Robert Floris
Jan van Eyck

Van Eijk
Anita van Eijk (born 1969), wife of Prince Pieter-Christiaan of Orange-Nassau, van Vollenhoven
Bram van Eijk (born 1996), Dutch football defender
Collin van Eijk (born 1991), Dutch football goalkeeper
Marc van Eijk (born 1981), Suriname-born Dutch footballer
Paul van Eijk (born 1986), Cook Islands footballer
Stig van Eijk (born 1981), Norwegian singer, composer and lyricist
Willem van Eijk (born 1941), Dutch serial killer
Wim van der Eijk (born 1957), Dutch Vice-president of the European Patent Office

See also
9561 van Eyck, main belt asteroid named after Jan van Eyck
Van Eyck (crater), crater on Mercury named after Jan van Eyck
Ten Eyck, Dutch surname of similar origin

External links
Catholic Encyclopedia

References

Dutch-language surnames
Eyck van
Surnames of Dutch origin
Toponymic surnames